Jamel Johnson (born 26 April 1990) is an American-Jamaican former professional footballer who played as a forward.

Career
Johnson attended American Heritage High School in Plantation, Florida where he was a two-time state Champion and 2008 tournament MVP. He played club soccer for West Pines United FC in Pembroke Pines, Florida, he was a US youth International and ODP Region 3 team member. He attended the University of North Carolina at Greensboro in 2009.

Johnson trialled with Danish club FC Fyn in August 2010. He signed his first professional contract with the club and was to remain with the club until 1 December.

Having previously trained with KSV Roeselare in Belgium as well as Hannover 96 and Hansa Rostock in Germany, he trialled with Mexican club CF Pachuca in summer 2011. In 2013 he signed to Austrian Wiener Stadtliga team :de:Gersthofer SV. In 2014, he was called into preseason camp with the New England Revolution but was later released. In 2016 Johnson registered with Danish club Aab.

References

1990 births
Living people
People from Plantation, Florida
Sportspeople from Pembroke Pines, Florida
American people of Jamaican descent
Soccer players from Florida
American soccer players
Association football forwards
UNC Greensboro Spartans men's soccer players
FC Fyn players
AaB Fodbold players
American expatriate soccer players
American expatriate sportspeople in Denmark
Expatriate men's footballers in Denmark
American expatriate sportspeople in Austria
Expatriate footballers in Austria